FlyPersia (Hevapimaii-ye Flâi Pershia) is an Iranian airline based in Shiraz that operates scheduled domestic flights.

History

Fly Persia, after registering with the Companies Registration Office in 2018, started its activity to receive the flight operations certificate from the National Aviation Organization, and after receiving this certificate in 2019 by making the first passenger flight from The origin of Shiraz to the holy city of Mashhad began its activities. The company was approved by the Supreme Aviation Council in 2017, and this airline was registered in the center of Shiraz. The Shiraz-based company operates at Shahid Dastgheib International Airport in Shiraz. Fly Persia began its operations with three aircraft.

Destinations

FlyPersia serves these destinations (as of March 2023)

Fleet

As of June 2020, FlyPersia operates 4 Aircraft

References

External links

Airlines of Iran
Airlines established in 2018
Iranian companies established in 2018